Navy Cut Tobacco is a defunct brand of cigarettes, originally manufactured by Imperial Brands – formerly John Player & Sons – in Nottingham, England. The brand became "Player's Navy Cut". They were particularly popular in Britain, Germany and British Ceylon (Sri Lanka) in the late 19th century and early part of the 20th century and were later produced in the United States. The packet has the distinctive logo of a sailor in a 'Navy Cut' cap.

The phrase "Navy Cut" is according to Player's adverts to originate from the habit of sailors taking a mixture of tobacco leaves and binding them with string or twine. The tobacco would then mature under pressure and the sailor could then dispense the tobacco by slicing off a "cut". The product is also available in pipe tobacco form.

Packaging
The cigarettes were available in tins and the original cardboard container was a four sided tray of cigarettes that slid out from a covering like a classic matchbox. The next design had fold in ends so that the cigarettes could be seen or dispensed without sliding out the tray. In the 1950s the packaging moved to the flip top design like most brands.

Marketing

The image of the sailor was known as "Hero" because of the name on his hat band. It was first used in 1883 and the lifebuoy was added five years later. The sailor images were an 1891 artists concept registered for Chester-based William Parkins and Co for their "Jack Glory" brand. Behind the sailor are two ships. The one on the left is thought to be HMS Britannia and the one on the right HMS Dreadnought or HMS Hero.

As time went by the image of the sailor changed as it sometimes had a beard and other times he was clean shaven. In 1927 "Hero" was standardised on a 1905 version. As part of the 1927 marketing campaign John Player and Sons commissioned an oil painting Head of a Sailor by Arthur David McCormick. The Player's Hero logo was thought to contribute to the cigarettes popularity in the 20s and 30s when competitor W.D. & H.O. Wills tried to create a similar image. Unlike Craven A, Navy Cut was intended to have a unisex appeal. Advertisements referred to "the appeal to Eve's fair daughters" and lines like "Men may come and Men may go".

Hero is thought to have originally meant to indicate traditional British values, but his masculinity appealed directly to men and as a potential uncle figure for younger women. One slogan written inside the packet was "It's the tobacco that counts" and another was "Player's Please" which was said to appeal to the perceived desire of the population to be included in the mass market. The slogan was so well known that it was sufficient in a shop to get a packet of this brand.

Player's Medium Navy Cut was the most popular by far of the three Navy Cut brands (there was also Mild and Gold Leaf). Two thirds of all the cigarettes sold in Britain were Players and two thirds of these was branded as Players Medium Navy Cut. In January 1937, Players sold nearly 3.5 million cigarettes (which included 1.34 million in London). The popularity of the brand was mostly amongst the middle class and in the South of England. While it was smoked in the north, other brands were locally more popular. The brand was discontinued in the UK in 2016.

References

External links

Imperial Brands website

Cigarette brands